The men's discus throw at the 2018 European Athletics Championships took place at the Olympic Stadium on 7 and 8 August.

Records

Schedule

Results

Qualification
Qualification: 64.00 m (Q) or best 12 performers (q)

Final

References

Discus Throw M
Discus throw at the European Athletics Championships